Belcastel is the name or part of the name of several communes in France:

 Belcastel, Aveyron, in the Aveyron département
 Belcastel, Tarn, in the Tarn département
 Belcastel-et-Buc, in the Aude département